Matthew Bush (born March 22, 1986) is an American actor, best known for the film Adventureland and his AT&T Rollover Minutes commercials. He starred in the TBS comedy Glory Daze as Eli Feldman, a freshman who rushes the wildest fraternity on a 1980s college campus. He also featured in a 2018 Pizza Hut commercial and plays Andy Cogan on The Goldbergs.

Life and career
Bush was born in Philadelphia and raised in Cherry Hill, New Jersey. He is of Italian descent. His parents, Linda and Dennis Bush, run a magic act. Bush attended Beck Middle School, Cherry Hill High School East and spent several semesters at Rowan University. He voiced the character of Pete "Petey" Kowalski in the 2006 videogame Bully (known as Canis Canem Edit outside of North America). He was also seen in a number of AT&T commercials as a member of a family arguing over the expiration of rollover minutes.

Filmography

Film

Television

Video games

References

External links
 

1986 births
21st-century American male actors
Male actors from New Jersey
American people of Italian descent
American male film actors
American male television actors
American male video game actors
American male voice actors
Cherry Hill High School East alumni
Living people
Male actors from Philadelphia
People from Cherry Hill, New Jersey
Rowan University alumni